The  Philadelphia Eagles season was the franchise's 26th season in the National Football League (NFL). They failed to improve on their previous output of 4–8, winning only two games. The team failed to qualify for the playoffs for the ninth consecutive season. In the offseason, Vince Lombardi was offered the Eagles head coaching position but he refused it. He opted to stay as the Offensive Coordinator of the New York Giants.

Off-season 
The Eagles hired the Air Force Academy's 1st head coach Buck Shaw. Shaw took over a last-place Eagles team and started rebuilding. He was also the 1st coach of the San Francisco 49ers when they formed in the AAFC in 1946. He immediately dealt Buck Lansford, Jimmy Harris, and a first-round draft choice to the Los Angeles Rams for 32-year-old, nine-year veteran quarterback Norm Van Brocklin.

NFL Draft 
The 1958 NFL Draft was held on December 2, 1957 (rounds 1–4) and January 28, 1958 (rounds 5–30). The draft was 30 rounds long with 12 teams making picks. A total of 360 players were selected.

With a 4–8 record in 1957 the Eagles made the 6th pick in the 1st round.

This was the last year in which the Lottery Bonus Pick was used. The Chicago Cardinals had the number 1 pick of the draft and the Bonus Pick. They used the picks to select as Lottery Bonus Pick King Hill a Quarterback out of Rice University. With the 2nd pick they chose 1957 Heisman Trophy winner John David Crow a Halfback out of Texas A&M University

Player selections 
The table shows the Eagles selections and what picks they had that were traded away and the team that ended up with that pick. It is possible the Eagles' pick ended up with this team via another team that the Eagles made a trade with.
Not shown are acquired picks that the Eagles traded away.

Schedule

Standings

Playoffs

Roster 
(All time List of Philadelphia Eagles players in franchise history)

 + After name means 1st team selection

Postseason

Honors and swards

References 

Philadelphia Eagles seasons
Philadelphia Eagles
Philadelphia